Ny Tid was a Norwegian publishing house with connections to the Communist Party of Norway.

Between 1924 and 1928, it published works by many of the party's most prominent politicians; translations of writings by Vladimir Lenin, Joseph Stalin, Grigory Zinoviev, and others; and poems by Rudolf Nilsen. One of the most important publications by a Norwegian was Olav Scheflo's Den røde tråd i Norges historie, which was controversial within the party.

Kristian Aune was responsible for the publishing house.

References

Publishing companies of Norway
Companies based in Oslo
Communist Party of Norway
Publishing companies established in 1924
Publishing companies disestablished in 1928
1928 disestablishments in Norway